MachineGames Sweden AB is a Swedish video game developer based in Uppsala. The studio was founded in 2009 by seven former employees of Starbreeze Studios, including founder Magnus Högdahl. After unsuccessfully pitching game ideas to several publishers, MachineGames agreed with Bethesda Softworks to develop a new instalment in the Wolfenstein series in July 2010, and was acquired by Bethesda's parent company, ZeniMax Media, in November. In the Wolfenstein series, MachineGames developed The New Order (2014), The Old Blood (2015), The New Colossus (2017), Youngblood (2019), and Cyberpilot (2019).

History 
MachineGames' founding team—consisting of Kjell Emanuelsson, Jerk Gustafsson, Magnus Högdahl, Jim Kjellin, Fredrik Ljungdahl, Jens Matthies, and Michael Wynne—was previously employed by Swedish video game company Starbreeze Studios, of which Högdahl was also the founder. By mid-2009, while the team was working on the game Syndicate, Starbreeze had grown to more than 100 employees, and the seven-piece team wanted to start anew. All seven left the studio and set up MachineGames in Uppsala, Sweden. An alternative name considered for the company was "Tungsten". Matthies became the company's creative director, while Gustafsson became managing director and executive producer. Högdahl and Wynne left shortly thereafter for personal reasons. For the first one-and-a-half years, the MachineGames team brainstormed game ideas and pitched them to various publishers, including Bethesda Softworks, being rejected on all of them. Running out of funds, the team considered either selling their homes to finance the studio further or close down the studio entirely.

Around this time, developer id Software and the rights to its Wolfenstein series of games were acquired by Bethesda's parent company, ZeniMax Media. Following this acquisition, Bethesda offered MachineGames to work on one of its intellectual properties, and when Matthies learned that no one was developing a Wolfenstein game at the time, he requested that MachineGames could develop one. Matthies, Gustafsson, and other MachineGames employees visited id Software in Mesquite, Texas, in July 2010 to talk about this prospect. Id Software was already impressed with the team's work while at Starbreeze, and only requested that MachineGames used their id Tech 5 engine for the endeavour. By November, all necessary paperwork for MachineGames to develop a Wolfenstein game was completed, and the studio became a subsidiary of ZeniMax to pursue development on what would later become Wolfenstein: The New Order. With this acquisition, MachineGames briefly changed its legal name to ZeniMax Sweden AB. The name was later reverted to MachineGames Sweden AB. After the acquisition, MachineGames began hiring new staff. According to Gustafsson, around 70% of the company's employees at the time were transplants from Starbreeze.

MachineGames developed Wolfenstein: The New Order (2014) and its prequel, Wolfenstein: The Old Blood (2015). In June 2016, they released a free episode for id Software's 1996 game Quake in celebration of the game's twentieth anniversary. At Electronic Entertainment Expo 2017, Wolfenstein II: The New Colossus, a sequel to The New Order, was announced with a release date of 27 October 2017 for Microsoft Windows, PlayStation 4 and Xbox One. MachineGames developed Wolfenstein: Youngblood, the follow-up to The New Colossus with a focus on co-operative gameplay, and Wolfenstein: Cyberpilot, a virtual reality game, both released in 2019.

MachineGames announced in January 2021 that its next game will be a title based on the Indiana Jones franchise in conjunction with Lucasfilm, with Todd Howard executive-producing.

Games developed

References

External links 
 

2010 mergers and acquisitions
Companies based in Uppsala County
Swedish companies established in 2009
Uppsala
Video game companies established in 2009
Video game companies of Sweden
Video game development companies
ZeniMax Media